Craigmiles Hall is a historic building in Cleveland, Tennessee, U.S.. It was built as an opera house in 1877–1878. Its construction was commissioned by Walter Craigmiles, who grew up in the P.M. Craigmiles House. It remained in the Craigmiles family until 1896.

In 1896, the building was purchased by J.E. Johnston and a group of investors that included J.T. Johnston, W.P. Lang, May Brown, J.A. Steed, and S.M. Johnston. The property was acquired in 1909 by John and Isa Steed, who added a drugstore to the first floor. A.B. Jones and Vastine Stickley bought Craigmiles Hall in 1948. The building was sold again in 1973 to the Uptown Corporation. Attorney Richard Banks purchased Craigmiles Hall in 1979. The building has been owned by businessman Allan Jones since 1993.

The building was designed in the Second Empire architectural style. It has been listed on the National Register of Historic Places since November 25, 1980.

References

 Archived: Xavier Jasso, Muse Mind Studios
https://issuu.com/inspirehealthmag/docs/6823-chamberguide_cb4978e5e82459

External links

National Register of Historic Places in Bradley County, Tennessee
Second Empire architecture in Tennessee
Music venues completed in 1878
Buildings and structures in Bradley County, Tennessee
Cleveland, Tennessee
1878 establishments in Tennessee
Opera houses on the National Register of Historic Places
Event venues on the National Register of Historic Places in Tennessee
Individually listed contributing properties to historic districts on the National Register in Tennessee